Until the Colours Run is the second studio album by the British rock band Lanterns on the Lake. It was released in the UK in October 2013 and in the US in January 2014 under Bella Union. The album was met to critical acclaim, Drowned In Sound declared it "one of the best records of the young decade".

Track listing

Written and arranged by Lanterns On The Lake, lyrics by Hazel Wilde

Personnel

 Hazel Wilde - Vocals, Piano, Guitar, Artwork
 Paul Gregory - Guitar, Engineering, Mixing, Production
 Sarah Kemp - Violin, Accordion, Cello
 Andy Scrogham - Bass, harmonium
 Oliver Ketteringham - Drums, harmonium

Additional personnel
 Noel Summerville - Mastering
 Katherine Medway - French Horn on "The Ghost That Sleeps In Me"

References

2014 albums
Bella Union albums
Lanterns on the Lake albums